Raoul Bardac (30 March 1881 – 30 July 1950) was a French classical composer and pianist.

Biography
Born in Paris in 1881, Bardac was Emma Bardac's son and became Claude Debussy's stepson after the marriage of the latter to his mother. He is the brother of Hélène Bardac, known as Dolly, who became Madame Gaston de Tinan and until her death in 1985, the beneficiary of Debussy's work.

Bardac inherited Debussy's Blüthner piano and took it to Meyssac when he retired.

Bardac died in Meyssac at the age of 69.

Works
 Cinq Mélodies (Paris: E. Demets, 1905)
 Trois Stances de Jean Moréas (Paris: E. Demets, 1905)
 Tel qu'en songe (words: Henri de Régnier) (Paris: E. Demets, 1905)
 Horizons, first collection (Paris: E. Demets, 1906)
 Esclavage (words by Henry Gauthier-Villars) (Paris: A.-Z. Mathot, 1910)
 Horizons, second collection (Paris: E. Demets, 1912)
 Petite suite majeure, for piano 4-hands (Paris: A. Durand, 1914)
 Simone (words by Remy de Gourmont) (Paris: A. Durand, 1914)

Bibliography
 Hommage à Raoul Bardac: Paris 1881 – Meyssac 1950 (Meyssac: Association Culture et Patrimoine du Canton de Meyssac, 2006)

References

External links
 BnF Data
 Raoul Bardac
 Les cloches de Casbeno (R. Bardac) - M. Marcuzzi, piano (YouTube)

1881 births
1950 deaths
20th-century classical composers
20th-century French male classical pianists
20th-century French composers
Musicians from Paris